Karatoula (also Καράτουλας Karatoulas) is a village in the municipal unit of Oleni, central Elis, Greece. Karatoula was the seat of the former municipality of Oleni. It is situated in a wide valley between hills, at about 90 m elevation. Karatoula is 1 km north of Magoula, 2 km west of Oleni (village), 2 km east of Charia, 13 km northwest of Olympia and 11 km northeast of Pyrgos. The river Alyseios, also known as Karatoulaiko Potami, flows west of the village.

History
According to book references, the ancient town Amphidolis was located at the site of present Karatoula..
Ottoman Years:
Karatoula was the largest village of Oleni region and almost at the center of many other small villages, at the time. It had an "Agas" administrative seat. The name of its first Agas was Kara-Toulas, hence the name of the village changed to Karatoula. Agas built his residence palace in the eastern part of the village on the dominant hill, the ruins of which survive even today, next to house Theodore Theodorakopoulos, doctor. 

Karatoula as adjoining the Episkopin Olena, and as relations with their respective bishops, had a high influence on all the passages of Oleni.
In the northern part of the village and spaced about twenty minutes there was small underground church. Ruins are preserved today under the name "Agios Dimitrios".

Karatoula gave brave warriors under the leadership of Pierros and Davouras, who met with other soldiers rising for Poussi Greek troops and took part in the battle Bodine.

Population

See also
List of settlements in Elis

External links
 Karatoula's Elementray School Page
 Karatoula GTP Travel Pages

References

Populated places in Elis